Yusefabad-e Khaleseh (also Romanized as Yūsefābād-e Khāleṣeh; also known as Yūsefābād, Yūsofābād, and Yūsufābād) is a village in Behnamvasat-e Jonubi Rural District, Javadabad District, Varamin County, Tehran Province, Iran. At the 2006 census, its population was 36, in 10 families.

References 

Populated places in Varamin County